The Edmund Fitzgerald (formerly known as Elizabeth) were a math rock band from Oxford, England, who disbanded in 2005. Their final line-up consisted of Yannis Philippakis on lead guitar and vocals, Lina Simon on rhythm guitar, and Jack Bevan on drums. Philippakis and Bevan later went on to join Foals.

Overview
The band were known for their live shows that featured intense epic songs with minimal vocals and disjointed, technical rhythms. Influences included Sweep the Leg Johnny and Sonic Youth. However, other influences were so numerous and varied that the group drew from the ideas of other bands rather than their finished product.

The band split in 2005, following the departure of Simon, who chose not to pursue a musical career. They also claimed that things had become "too serious" and that they wanted to have more fun making music. This new desire resulted in the formation of Foals.

Discography

References

English rock music groups
Music in Oxford
Math rock groups
Musical groups from Oxford